On Tuesday, 23 October 2012 at midnight local time (21:00 GMT) there was an explosion at the Yarmouk munitions factory, south of Khartoum, Sudan. The factory had been built in 1996. According to Khartoum State Governor Abdel Rahman Al-Khidir, the explosion probably happened at the main storage facility. The resulting fire resulted in the death of two people and one person being injured.  According to Sudanese opposition, the arms factory belonged to Iran's Revolutionary Guard.

Ahmed Bilal Osman, Sudanese culture and information minister, blamed this on an airstrike by four Israeli aircraft. He claimed that Sudan found unexploded Israeli rockets.  Analysts say that Sudan is used as an arms-smuggling route to the Gaza Strip, which is governed by the Islamist militant organization Hamas.

According to the Sunday Times, this operation "was seen as a dry run for a forthcoming attack on Iran’s nuclear facilities."

Analysis by military experts at the Satellite Sentinel Project suggested that the target may have been a batch of around 40 shipping containers, containing highly volatile cargo.

Reaction
  Osman further said that Sudan has a "right to react" and to strike Israel. Daffa-Alla Elhag Ali Osman, Sudanese ambassador to the UN, brought the case to the UN Security Council. He also claimed that Israel had violated Sudanese air space three times in recent years.  Three hundred people chanted outside of a government building "Death to Israel" and "Remove Israel from the map."
  Amos Gilad, an Israeli defence official, said on 24 October that "Sudan is a dangerous terrorist state" but refused to confirm an Israeli involvement.
  sent two Iranian warships to Sudan, where the fleet commanders met with Sudanese navy commanders.

See also
 Al-Shifa pharmaceutical factory — a pharmaceutical factory in Khartoum that was destroyed by a US cruise missile in 1998
 2009 Sudan airstrikes — two alleged Israeli airstrikes in Sudan in 2009

References

External links
  

2012 in Sudan
Airstrikes by target
Aerial operations and battles involving Israel
October 2012 events in Africa
21st century in Khartoum
Iran–Israel proxy conflict
Israel–Sudan military relations
Airstrikes in Africa